Platanos is a village and a community in the municipal unit of Akrata, Achaea, Greece. In 2011 Platanos had a population of 231 for the village, and 259 for the community, which includes the mountain villages Ano Potamia, Korinthiako Balkoni and Tsivlos. The village Platanos consists of two parts: the seaside settlement Paralia Platanou (or Paralia Platanos) on the Gulf of Corinth and Platanos proper at about 250 m elevation on a mountain slope directly above Paralia Platanou. The villages Ano Potamia and Tsivlos are about 10 km south of Platanos. Platanos is 5 km west of Akrata and 18 km southeast of Aigio. The Greek National Road 8A (Athens - Corinth - Patras) and the railway Corinth - Patras pass north of Platanos.

Population

External links
 Akrata on GTP Travel Pages

See also

List of settlements in Achaea

References

Populated places in Achaea